Richard A. Turner (born 1935) was an American politician in the state of Kentucky. He served in the Kentucky House of Representatives as a Republican from 1980 to 1996 and in 1976.
 
Turner was caught in the FBI investigation of Kentucky horse racing industry called Operation Boptrot.  He was convicted of filing a fake campaign finance report.(1983)

References

Living people
Republican Party members of the Kentucky House of Representatives
1935 births
People from Monroe County, Kentucky
People from Pikeville, Kentucky
Kentucky politicians convicted of crimes